The UK National Panorama Competition, a Saturday evening event that immediately precedes the Notting Hill Carnival, is a major showcase for Trinidad and Tobago Steel Pan, or (Steel Band), music. Held at Emslie Horniman's Pleasance park in the London Borough of Kensington and Chelsea it typically involves approximately 1,000 performers, and attracts almost 5,000 spectators. Steel Bands from around the UK prepare a music performance, arranged to last for up to 10 minutes, and compete for the Panorama Championship.

Ebony Steel Band Trust has dominated this competition over the years winning nineteen times; although the crown has been passed on to Mangrove Steel Orchestra for 2011

From 2007-2009 the event was  held at London's Hyde Park, and broadcast by BBC radio.

Results

2011

2017

2018

References

External links
"UK National Steelband Panorama Competition 2009"; panonthenet.com. Retrieved 28 March 2011
"2004 National Panorama Competition"; carnaval.com. Retrieved 28 March 2011
2005 Panorama Winners

Steelpan music
Music competitions in the United Kingdom